Batopilasia is a genus of flowering plants belonging to the family Asteraceae. It contains a single species, Batopilasia byei.

Its native range is Northeastern Mexico.

References

Astereae
Monotypic Asteraceae genera